The 15551/15552 Darbhanga–Varanasi City Antyodaya Express is an Express train belonging to East Central Railway zone that runs between  and .

It is being operated with 15551/15552 train numbers on a weekly basis.

Coach composition 

The trains is completely general coaches trains designed by Indian Railways with features of LED screen display to show information about stations, train speed etc. Vending machines for water. Bio toilets in compartments as well as CCTV cameras and mobile charging points and toilet occupancy indicators.

Service

15551/Darbhanga–Varanasi City Antyodaya Express has an average speed of 41 km/hr and covers 405 km in 9 hrs 50 mins.
15552/Varanasi City–Darbhanga Antyodaya Express has an average speed of 36 km/hr and covers 405 km in 11 hrs 20 mins.

Route and halts 

The important halts of the train are:

 Darbhanga Junction
 
 
 
 
 
 
 
 Varanasi City

Schedule

Rake sharing

The train shares its rake with 22551/22552 Darbhanga–Jalandhar City Antyodaya Express.

Direction reversal

Train reverses its direction at:

See also 
 Antyodaya Express

Notes

References 

Antyodaya Express trains
Rail transport in Bihar
Passenger trains originating from Varanasi
Railway services introduced in 2019